Lewis Courtney Gordon (born 12 February 2001) is a professional footballer who plays as a left back for EFL League One club Bristol Rovers. He is a product of the Watford academy and began his professional career with Brentford. He was capped by Scotland at youth level.

Club career

Youth years 
A left back, Gordon joined the Watford academy at U7 level and progressed to sign his first professional contract on 6 March 2018. Gordon was named the club's 2017–18 Academy Player of the Year and progressed to the U23 team, but after a spell on loan with National League South club St Albans City, he was released in June 2020.

Brentford 
On 4 September 2020, Gordon joined the B team at Championship club Brentford and signed a one-year contract, with the option of a further year, on a free transfer. He made his first team debut with a start in a 2–1 FA Cup third round victory over Middlesbrough on 9 January 2021. Gordon was an unused substitute during four late-regular season matches, but was not involved during Brentford's successful playoff campaign. Gordon made 32 appearances and scored one goal during the 2020–21 B team season and the one-year option on his contract was taken up in June 2021. Gordon spent the majority of the 2021–22 pre-season with the first team squad, but did not win a call-up during the regular season. Following more than 70 B team appearances over two seasons, Gordon was released when his contract expired at the end of the 2021–22 season.

Bristol Rovers

Following a trial period with Crystal Palace U23, Gordon signed a two-year contract with League One club Bristol Rovers on 6 August 2022. He made his debut for the club later that day, with a start in a 4–0 win over Burton Albion.

International career 
Of Scottish descent through his grandmother, Gordon was capped by Scotland at U17 and U19 level. He was a part of the Scotland squad which was unsuccessful in qualifying for the 2018 UEFA European U17 Championship.

Career statistics

Honours 
Brentford B

 London Senior Cup: 2021–22

Individual
 Watford Academy Player of the Year: 2017–18

References

External links 
 
 Lewis Gordon at bristolrovers.co.uk
 
 

2001 births
Living people
English people of Scottish descent
Footballers from Greater London
English footballers
Association football fullbacks
Black British sportsmen
Scotland youth international footballers
Watford F.C. players
St Albans City F.C. players
Brentford F.C. players
Bristol Rovers F.C. players
National League (English football) players
English Football League players